Mestri is a 2009 Indian Telugu-language political drama film directed by Suresh Krissna and produced by K. Ramakrishna Prasad. The film stars Dasari Narayana Rao, who also wrote the story and screenplay, alongside Vijayachander, Pradeep Rawat, Vijayakumar and Srihari. It was released on 12 March 2009. Rao won the Nandi Award for Best Actor.

Plot 

A new labourer at the dockyard suddenly garners the accolades of his colleagues and soon due to his intelligence and the good deeds for his mates becomes their leader. At the same time there are murders of those who seem to be suspicious. Who is their killer? Where from has this new labourer come from? What is his history and ulterior motive?

Cast 
Dasari Narayana Rao as Palakollu
Vijayachander as Gopalakrishna
Pradeep Rawat as Subbaraju
Sayaji Shinde as Apparaju
Vijayakumar as a fake Gandhian
Srihari as a suspended cop
Hema Chaudhary
Madhusudhan Rao as an army officer
Mohan Babu (cameo appearance)

Production 
Mestri was directed by Suresh Krissna, and produced by K. Ramakrishna Prasad under Soubhagya Films. Dasari Narayana Rao wrote the story and screenplay, and Rajendra Kumar wrote the dialogues. Cinematography was handled by Ch. Ramana Raju, and editing by Gowtam Raju. Shooting took place predominantly at Ramoji Film City.

Soundtrack 
The soundtrack was composed by Vandemataram Srinivas. It was released on 23 February 2009.

Release and reception 
Mestri was released on 12 March 2009, and became controversial because many of its dialogues were interpreted as being targeted at the-then Praja Rajyam Party chief Chiranjeevi, despite Krissna's denial. Deepa Garimella of Fullhyd gave the film an overall rating of 5 out of 10. She gave 7 points for the cast performances, 5 for the script, 7.5 for the music and 6 for the visuals. Radhika Rajamani of Rediff.com rated the film two stars out of five, saying, "One has to wait to see if the climate is favourable for Mestri's percolation to the audience in all the centres." The Times of India said it "fails to impress on many counts. Barring some potshots against Chiranjeevi and advising youngsters not to be 'star-struck', the film offers little else. Even the predictable and slow-moving screenplay takes its toll on the audience." Sify wrote, "The film is just laced on a Utopian model and hence lacks entertainment values."

References

External links 
 
 

2000s political drama films
2000s Telugu-language films
Films directed by Suresh Krissna
Films scored by Vandemataram Srinivas
Indian political drama films